Autonym may refer to:

 Autonym, the name used by a person to refer to themselves or their language; see Exonym and endonym
 Autonym (botany), an automatically created infrageneric or infraspecific name

See also
 Nominotypical subspecies, in zoology, a similar concept to autonym in botany
 Xenonym
 -onym
Autonomy